Spot-nosed guenon may refer to either of two species in the genus Cercopithecus:

Greater spot-nosed monkey, Cercopithecus nictitans
Lesser spot-nosed monkey, Cercopithecus petaurista

Animal common name disambiguation pages